Story from Croatia (also distributed internationally as Idaho Potato, after the English-named rock band led by the film's protagonist) is a 1991 Croatian film directed by Krsto Papić. It was Croatia's submission to the 65th Academy Awards for the Academy Award for Best Foreign Language Film, but was not accepted as a nominee.

Cast

See also
 Cinema of Croatia
 List of submissions to the 65th Academy Awards for Best Foreign Language Film
 List of Croatian submissions for the Academy Award for Best Foreign Language Film

References

External links

Story from Croatia at Film.hr 

1991 films
1991 drama films
1990s Croatian-language films
Films shot in Croatia
Films directed by Krsto Papić
Croatian drama films